Attica Blues may refer to:
Attica Blues (album), by avant-garde jazz saxophonist Archie Shepp
Attica Blues (band), from United Kingdom